Marcos José Carvajal (August 19, 1984 – January 24, 2018) was a Venezuelan relief pitcher who played for the Colorado Rockies and Florida Marlins of Major League Baseball. Listed at 6' 4", 175 lb. , Carvajal batted and threw right-handed.

Career

On May 3, for the Single-A Columbus Catfish, Carvajal combined with starter Chuck Tiffany for a seven-inning no-hitter. Tiffany pitched the first five innings followed by Carvajal, who threw the final two innings. He then was selected in the Rule 5 draft by the Milwaukee Brewers on December 13, 2004. On that same day, the Colorado Rockies acquired him for cash or a player to be named later.

Carvajal made his major league debut on April 6, with the Colorado Rockies, as he became the youngest player in Rockies history at 20 years and 230 days old, beating Jamey Wright's previous record of 21 years and 191 days old. He then spent the whole 2005 season with the Rockies because he was a Rule 5 draft choice; if he had been taken off the roster, the Dodgers would have had the right to claim him back.

On December 7, 2005, Carvajal was traded to the Seattle Mariners for catcher Yorvit Torrealba. On April 6, he was sent to the Tampa Bay Devil Rays in exchange for a minor leaguer. He would then spend the whole 2006 season with the Double-A Montgomery Biscuits, posting a 3.86 ERA in 72.1 innings.

On February 16, Carvajal was claimed off waivers by the New York Mets. He began the year for the Double-A Binghamton Mets, where he was converted to a starter.

On September 7, 2007, the Mets designated him for assignment and on September 12, and he was claimed off waivers by the Florida Marlins. He was released by the Marlins on July 6, .

After that Carvajal pitched until 2011 in the Minors, Italian Baseball, Mexican League, and the Venezuelan Winter League.

Death
Carvajal died on January 24, 2018, in Ciudad Bolívar at the age of 33 of pneumonia due to medicine shortages in Venezuela.

See also
 List of Major League Baseball players from Venezuela

References

External links
, or Retrosheet
Pura Pelota Venezuelan Winter League statistics
The ESPN Baseball Encyclopedia – Gary Gillette, Peter Gammons, Pete Palmer. Publisher: Sterling Publishing, 2005. Format: Paperback, 1824pp. Language: English. 

1984 births
2018 deaths
Águilas del Zulia players
Albuquerque Isotopes players
Binghamton Mets players
Cardenales de Lara players
Caribes de Oriente players
Colorado Rockies players
Columbus Catfish players
Deaths from pneumonia in Venezuela
Florida Marlins players
Grosseto Baseball Club players
Venezuelan expatriate baseball players in Italy
Guerreros de Oaxaca players
Gulf Coast Dodgers players
Jacksonville Suns players
Leones del Caracas players
Major League Baseball pitchers
Major League Baseball players from Venezuela
Mexican League baseball pitchers
Montgomery Biscuits players
Ogden Raptors players
People from Ciudad Bolívar
St. George Roadrunners players
Venezuelan expatriate baseball players in Mexico
Venezuelan expatriate baseball players in the United States